Cees Benedictus-Lieftinck (16 June 1920 – 25 February 2008) was a Dutch equestrian. She competed in two events at the 1972 Summer Olympics.

References

1920 births
2008 deaths
Dutch female equestrians
Dutch dressage riders
Olympic equestrians of the Netherlands
Equestrians at the 1972 Summer Olympics
Sportspeople from Groningen (city)